The Sahitya Akademi Award is an honour that is given to Indian writers. This list documents the Santali writers that have received the honour since 2005.

Recipients

Translation into Santali
There have been writers that have been awarded the Sahitya Akademi Award for translating literary works into Santali.
 2010 : Shobha Nath Besra for Rahla Raybar (translated from Sanskrit)
 2011 : Thakurdas Murmu for Santal Pahra (Voi. I & 11) (translated from Odiya)
 2012 : Rabindranath Murmu for Ita Chetan Re Ita (translated from Bangla)
 2013 : Mangal Majhi for Malang Anal (translated from Bangla)
 2015 : Tala Tudu for Baplanij (translated from Bangla)
 2016 : Ganesh Thakur Hansda for Bhognadi Reyak Dahire (translated from Bangla).
 2017 : Surya Singh Besra for Maktom Rasa (translated from Hindi).
 2018 : Rupchand Hansda  for Sen Dareyak'an Menkhan Chedak (translated from Bangla).

References

Santali